Petreștii de Jos is a commune in Cluj County, Transylvania, Romania. It is composed of seven villages: Crăești (Pusztaszentkirály), Deleni (Indal), Livada (Tordaegres), Petreștii de Jos, Petreștii de Mijloc (Középpeterd), Petreștii de Sus (Felsőpeterd) and Plaiuri (Tordahagymás).

Demographics
According to the census from 2011 there was a total population of 1,512 people living in this commune. Of this population, 93.25% were ethnic Romanians and 2.58% ethnic Romani.

References

Atlasul localităților județului Cluj (Cluj County Localities Atlas), Suncart Publishing House, Cluj-Napoca, 

Communes in Cluj County
Localities in Transylvania